Topoli (Bulgarian: Тополи) is a village in north-eastern Bulgaria. It is located in the municipality of Varna, Varna Province.

As of March 2015 the village has a population of 3 055.

References

Villages in Varna Province